Arnold Babb Gridley, 1st Baron Gridley, KBE (16 July 1878 – 27 July 1965) was a British Conservative Member of Parliament (MP).

Gridley was the son of Edward Gridley of Abbey Dore in Herefordshire. He worked as a consulting engineer but later turned to politics. In 1935 he was elected to the House of Commons for Stockport, a seat he held until the constituency was abolished in 1950, and then represented Stockport South from 1950 to 1955. The latter year he was raised to the peerage as Baron Gridley, of Stockport in the County Palatine of Chester.

Lord Gridley married Mabel, daughter of Oliver Hudson, in 1905. He died in July 1965, aged 87, and was succeeded in the barony by his eldest son Arnold.

References

Kidd, Charles, Williamson, David (editors). Debrett's Peerage and Baronetage (1990 edition). New York: St Martin's Press, 1990.

External links 
 

1878 births
1965 deaths
Chairmen of the 1922 Committee
UK MPs 1935–1945
UK MPs 1945–1950
UK MPs 1950–1951
UK MPs 1951–1955
UK MPs who were granted peerages
People educated at Bristol Grammar School
Conservative Party (UK) MPs for English constituencies
English engineers
People from Herefordshire
Members of the Parliament of the United Kingdom for Stockport
Hereditary barons created by Elizabeth II